Early general elections were held in the New Hebrides on 29 November 1977 following the dissolution of the Representative Assembly elected in 1975 due to the Vanua'aku Pati blocking its work in order to protest the inclusion of members elected by the Chamber of Commerce.

The Vanua'aku Pati and other pro-independence parties boycotted the elections, meaning no seats were contested. The result was a victory for the francophone Tanunion. Nagriamel emerged as the second-largest party with seven seats.

Background
After the elections were announced, the Vanua'aku Pati issued a list of five demands that if not met, would result in them boycotting the elections. The demands were that voting rights be restricted to the indigenous population, the voting age be reduced to 18, a party winning a majority of seats be able to form a government alone, that the new government should have the powers required for self-government, and that an independence referendum be held by the end of the year.

Results
Of the 38 members elected, 26 were new to the Assembly.

Nagriamel won seven seats and the Natatok Efate party won five. Other parties that won seats included the Movement for the Autonomy of the New Hebrides (MANH), Tanunion (a successor to the UCNH) and the Federation of Independents (FEDIP).

A majority group of 21 representatives was established by Tanunion, Natatok Efate and two independents. FEDIP, the MANH and Nagriamel joined with three independents to form an opposition bloc holding the remaining 17 seats.

Aftermath
On election day the Vanua'aku Pati announced the establishment of a People's Provisional Government, raising its flag at 47 of 50 party locations. It subsequently which took control of large areas of several islands until it was dissolved in May 1978.

When the newly elected Assembly met, Maxime Carlot Korman was elected as its president. George Kalsakau of Natatok Efate was appointed as the first Chief Minister, heading a seven-member Council of Ministers including four members of the Tanunion/Natatko Efate group and two members of the FEDIP/MANH group.

On 15 December 1978 Kalsakau lost a motion of no confidence by thirty votes to six, and was removed as Chief Minister; the following day he was appointed as the Speaker of the Assembly. On 21 December he was succeeded as Chief Minister by Gérard Leymang who formed a unity government including the Vanua'aku Pati. Vanua'aku Pati leader Walter Lini was appointed Deputy Chief Minister and Minister for Social Affairs.

References

Elections in Vanuatu
1970s in Vanuatu
1977 election
New Hebrides
November 1977 events in Oceania
Uncontested elections